The 120 members of the fifth Knesset were elected on 1 August 1961. The breakdown by party was as follows:
Mapai: 42
Herut: 17
Liberal Party: 17
National Religious Party: 12
Mapam: 9
Ahdut HaAvoda: 8
Maki: 5
Agudat Yisrael: 4
Poalei Agudat Yisrael: 2
Cooperation and Brotherhood: 2
Progress and Development: 2

Members of the Fifth Knesset

Replacements

External links
Members of the Fifth Knesset Knesset website

 
05